Richard H. Weisberg is a professor of constitutional law at the Cardozo School of Law at Yeshiva University in New York City, and a leading scholar on law and literature.

Biography
Weisberg received his B.A. degree from Brandeis University in 1965, Ph.D. degree from Cornell University in 1970, and J.D. degree from Columbia University in 1974.

He has written many articles and books on law and literature, including The Failure of the Word: The Protagonist as Lawyer in Modern Fiction, When Lawyers Write, and Poethics: and Other Strategies of Law and Literature. His other books are Vichy Law and the Holocaust in France and In Praise of Intransigence: The Perils of Flexibility. He was a Guggenheim Fellow and a recipient of the France's Legion of Honor in 2008.

On October 23, 2014, Weisberg was named by President Barack Obama to the Commission for the Preservation of America’s Heritage Abroad.

References

External links
 Weisberg's profile at Cardozo Law School's website

Cardozo School of Law faculty
Columbia Law School alumni
Cornell University alumni
Living people
Brandeis University alumni
Year of birth missing (living people)